Hill Dickinson is a British international commercial law firm headquartered in Liverpool, United Kingdom. With more than 200 partners and 950 staff, the firm operates from six UK offices and four overseas offices.

History
Hill Dickinson's origins can be traced back to 1810, with the establishment of a Liverpool legal practice by the firm's founder, Edward Morrall. John Edward Gray Hill joined the firm in 1865. John Dickinson (1847–1907) became a partner in 1872, and the firm traded as Duncan, Hill & Dickinson.

In 1927 Edith Berthen joined the firm as one of the first women in England and Wales to qualify as a solicitor. In 1931 one of the firm's solicitors, Hector Munro, represented William Herbert Wallace in connection with his trial and subsequent appeal against his conviction for the murder of his wife Julia in their home in Wolverton Street in Liverpool's Anfield district. His conviction was later overturned by the Court of Criminal Appeal, the first instance in British legal history where an appeal had been allowed after re-examination of evidence (see R v Wallace).

Partner William Goffey (known as WG) started his career in 1901 at Hill Dickinson's 10 Water Street office. He became senior partner in 1950 and continued to practice until shortly before his death in 1979 at the age of 94. As the son of a ship owning family who operated sailing barques from Liverpool under the name Goffey & Co, much of his practice was Admiralty and related work.

In the Black Solicitors Network's Diversity League Table 2009 Hill Dickinson was ranked 30th within the top 100 UK law firms. In January 2010, the firm was ranked as the sixth most female friendly firm (among the top 50 UK firms by turnover) with 27 per cent of its partnership made up of women.

Mergers and acquisitions
 DLA Manchester and Sheffield insurance practice (2013)
 Halliwells LLP, Liverpool and Sheffield offices (2010)
 Middleton Potts (2009)
 Gamon Arden & Co. (2007)
 Hill Taylor Dickinson, remerger following demerger in 1989 (2006)
 Bullivant Jones & Co. (2004)
 Gorna & Co (2001)
 Davis Campbell (1997)
 Matthew Arnold & Baldwin LLP - On 31 January 2016, Matthew Arnold & Baldwin LLP ceased to operate as a law firm. Partners and key staff have joined other firms including Hill Dickinson (2016)

Offices 
Hill Dickinson operates from six UK offices and four overseas offices. The firm's headquarters are in Liverpool at No. 1 St Paul's Square. Other UK locations are Manchester, Leeds and  a new Newcastle office (opened in 2022)  and two offices in London; The Broadgate Tower and on Jermyn Street. Overseas locations are Singapore, Greece, Monaco and Hong Kong.

See also
 List of largest UK law firms

References

External links
 

Law firms of England
Law firms established in 1810
Law firms of Singapore
1810 establishments in England
Companies based in Liverpool
Foreign law firms with offices in Hong Kong